The 1913 All-Western college football team consists of American football players selected to the All-Western teams chosen by various selectors for the 1913 college football season. Five Western players were also selected as consensus All-Americans on the 1913 College Football All-America Team: Miller Pontius (tackle, Michigan), Ray Keeler (guard, Wisconsin), Paul Des Jardien (center, Chicago), Gus Dorais (quarterback, Notre Dame), and James B. Craig (halfback, Michigan).

All-Western selections

Ends
 Lorin Solon, Minnesota (CDN-1, CON, CRH, CT, ECP-1, IO-2, WE-1)
 Knute Rockne, Notre Dame (CDN-1, CON, CT, ECP-2, IO-1, WE-1) (CFHOF)
 Clark Shaughnessy, Minnesota (CDN-2 [fullback], CRH, ECP-1 [guard]) (CFHOF)
 Blake Miller, Michigan Agricultural (ECP-1)
 Norman K. Wilson, Illinois (ECP-2)
 Earl Huntington, Chicago (CDN-2, WE-2)
 Harold Ofstie, Wisconsin (CDN-2, IO-1)
 Harold Pogue, Illinois (IO-2)
 Ralph B. Henning, Michigan Agricultural (WE-2)

Tackles
 Robert Butler, Wisconsin (CDN-1, CON, CRH, CT, ECP-1, IO-1, WE-1)
 Miller Pontius, Michigan (CDN-1, ECP-1, IO-1, WE-2) [CAA]
 Brown, South Dakota (CON, CRH)
 Vic Halligan, Nebraska (CT, WE-1)
 Archie Kirk, Iowa (ECP-2, IO-2)
 Gideon Smith, Michigan Agricultural (ECP-2)
 Chester W. Gifford, Michigan Agricultural (CDN-2, IO-2, WE-2)
 Harold Ernest Goettler, Chicago (CDN-2)

Guards
 Ernest Allmendinger, Michigan (CDN-2, CON, CRH, CT, WE-1)
 Ray Keeler, Wisconsin (CDN-2, CON, CRH, ECP-2, IO-1, WE-2) [CAA]
 Faunt V. Lenardson, Michigan Agricultural (CDN-1, CT, WE-1)
 Harris, Chicago (CDN-1, ECP-2, IO-2)
 George C. Paterson, Michigan (ECP-1)
 Boles Rosenthal, Minnesota (IO-1)
 H. B. Routh, Purdue (IO-2)
 James J. Gallagher, Missouri (WE-2)

Centers
 Paul Des Jardien, Chicago (CDN-1, CON, CRH, CT, ECP-1, IO-1, WE-1) [CAA, CFHOF]
 C. E. Glossop, Purdue (CDN-2, ECP-2)
 George C. Paterson, Michigan (IO-2)
 Al Feeney, Notre Dame (WE-2)

Quarterbacks
 Gus Dorais, Notre Dame (CDN-1, CON, CRH, CT, ECP-2, IO-1, WE-1) [CAA, CFHOF]
 Pete Russell, Chicago (ECP-1, WE-2)
 Samuel Gross, Iowa (CDN-2)
 Wilbur Hightower, Northwestern (IO-2)

Halfbacks
 James B. Craig, Michigan (CDN-1, CON, CRH, CT, ECP-1, IO-1, WE-1) [CAA]
 Nelson Norgren, Chicago (CDN-1, CON, CRH, CT, ECP-1, IO-1, WE-1)
 William McAlmon, Minnesota (ECP-2)
 Gray, Chicago (CDN-2, ECP-2)
 Miller, Michigan Agricultural (CDN-2)
 Leonard Purdy, Nebraska (IO-2)
 Elmer Oliphant, Purdue (IO-2) (CFHOF)
 Richard B. Rutherford, Nebraska (WE-2)
 Joe Pliska, Notre Dame (WE-2)

Fullbacks 
 Ray Eichenlaub, Notre Dame (CDN-1, CON, CRH, CT, ECP-1, IO-1, WE-1) (CFHOF)
 George E. Julian, Michigan State (ECP-2, IO-2, WE-2)

Key
Bold = consensus choice by a majority of the selectors

CDN = Chicago Daily News

CON = Based on "consensus of opinion of sporting writers and experts who have already picked teams"

CRH = Chicago Record-Herald by M. J. Wathey

CT = Chicago Tribune

ECP = E. C. Patterson for Collier's Weekly

IO = The Inter Ocean

WE = Walter Eckersall

CAA = Consensus All-American during the 1913 college football season

CFHOF = College Football Hall of Fame

See also
1913 College Football All-America Team

References

1913 Western Conference football season
All-Western college football teams